Louargat is a commune in the Côtes-d'Armor department of Brittany in northwestern France.

Geography

Climate
Louargat has a oceanic climate (Köppen climate classification Cfb).

Population

Inhabitants of Louargat are called Louargatais in French.

Breton language
The municipality launched a linguistic plan through Ya d'ar brezhoneg on 14 June 2007.
In 2008, 16.06% of primary school children attended bilingual schools.

See also
Communes of the Côtes-d'Armor department

References

External links

Communes of Côtes-d'Armor